Seetha is an Indian actress. She handled lead roles and supporting roles during the 1990s in Malayalam, Telugu and Tamil. She hails from Tamil Nadu. Currently she is acting in Tamil serials. She entered Malayalam film field with the film 'Bhoomigeetham (1993)'. 
She was also a famous child artist.

Partial filmography

Television serials

TV Shows
 Flowers Oru Kodi - Participant - Malayalam Show
 Naduvula Konjam Disturb Pannuvom - Participant - Tamil Show

References

External links

 Seetha at MSI

Actresses in Malayalam cinema
Indian film actresses
Actresses in Tamil cinema
Actresses in Telugu cinema
Actresses from Tamil Nadu
20th-century Indian actresses
21st-century Indian actresses
Actresses in Malayalam television
Actresses in Tamil television
Actresses in Telugu television
Child actresses in Malayalam cinema
Child actresses in Tamil cinema
Child actresses in Kannada cinema
Child actresses in Telugu cinema
Actresses in Hindi cinema